Graham Hocking (born 8 January 1952) is a former professional Australian rules football player at the South Melbourne. He debuted against Hawthorn in round 5, 1971. He played 50 reserve games and one senior game. He is the father of Essendon player Heath Hocking.

References

External links

1952 births
Living people
Sydney Swans players
Australian rules footballers from Victoria (Australia)